The thirty-seventh government of Israel is the current cabinet of Israel, formed on 29 December 2022 following the Knesset election on 1 November 2022. The coalition government consists of six parties—Likud, United Torah Judaism, Shas, Religious Zionist Party, Otzma Yehudit, and Noam—and is led by Benjamin Netanyahu, who has taken office as the Prime Minister of Israel for the sixth time.

Some of the government's policy proposals have drawn widespread criticism, both domestic and abroad, sparking waves of protests across the country.

Background 

The right-wing bloc of parties, led by Benjamin Netanyahu, known in Israel as the national camp, won 64 of the 120 seats in the elections for the Knesset, while the coalition led by the incumbent prime minister Yair Lapid won 51 seats. The new majority has been variously described as the most right-wing government in Israeli history, as well as Israel’s most religious government.

Shortly after the elections, Lapid conceded to Netanyahu, and congratulated him, wishing him luck "for the sake of the Israeli people". On 15 November, the swearing-in ceremony for the newly elected members of the 25th Knesset was held during the opening session. The vote to appoint a new Speaker of the Knesset, which is usually conducted at the opening session, and the swearing in of cabinet members were postponed since ongoing coalition negotiations had not yet resulted in agreement on these positions.

Government formation 

On 3 November 2022, Netanyahu told his aide Yariv Levin to begin informal coalition talks with allied parties, after 97% of the vote was counted. The leader of the Shas party Aryeh Deri met with Yitzhak Goldknopf, the leader of United Torah Judaism and its Agudat Yisrael faction, on 4 November. The two parties agreed to cooperate as members of the next government. The Degel HaTorah faction of United Torah Judaism stated on 5 November that it will maintain its ideological stance about not seeking any ministerial posts, as per the instruction of its spiritual leader Rabbi Gershon Edelstein, but will seek other senior posts like Knesset committee chairmen and deputy ministers.

Netanyahu himself started holding talks on 6 November. He first met with Moshe Gafni, the leader of Degel HaTorah, and then with Goldknopf. Meanwhile, the Religious Zionist Party leader Bezalel Smotrich and the leader of its Otzma Yehudit faction Itamar Ben-Gvir pledged that they would not enter the coalition without the other faction. Gafni later met with Smotrich for coalition talks. Smotrich then met with Netanyahu. On 7 November, Netanyahu met with Ben-Gvir who demanded the Ministry of Public Security with expanded powers for himself and the Ministry of Education or Transport and Road Safety for Yitzhak Wasserlauf. A major demand among all of Netanyahu's allies was that the Knesset be allowed to ignore the rulings of the Supreme Court. Netanyahu met with the Noam faction leader and its sole MK Avi Maoz on 8 November after he threatened to boycott the coalition. He demanded complete control of the Western Wall by the Haredi rabbinate and removal of what he considered as anti-Zionist and anti-Jewish content in schoolbooks. 

 

President Isaac Herzog began consultations with heads of all the political parties on 9 November after the election results were certified. During the consultations, he expressed his reservations about Ben-Gvir becoming a member in the next government. Shas met with Likud for coalition talks on 10 November. By 11 November, Netanyahu had secured recommendations from 64 MKs, which constituted a majority. He was given the mandate to form the thirty-seventh government of Israel by President Herzog on 13 November. Otzma Yehudit and Noam officially split from Religious Zionism on 20 November as per a pre-election agreement.

On 25 November, Otzma Yehudit and Likud signed a coalition agreement, under which Ben-Gvir will assume the newly created position of National Security Minister, whose powers would be more expansive than that of the Minister of Public Security, including overseeing the Israel Police and the Israel Border Police in the West Bank, as well as giving powers to authorities to shoot thieves stealing from military bases. Yitzhak Wasserlauf was given the Ministry for the Development of the Negev and the Galilee with expanded powers to regulate new West Bank settlements, while separating it from the "Periphery" portfolio, which will be given to Shas. The deal also includes giving the Ministry of Heritage to Amihai Eliyahu, separating it from the "Jerusalem Affairs" portfolio, the chairmanship of the Knesset's Public Security Committee to Zvika Fogel and that of the Special Committee for the Israeli Citizens' Fund to Limor Son Har-Melech, the post of Deputy Economic Minister to Almog Cohen, establishment of a national guard, and expansion of mobilization of reservists in the Border Police.

Netanyahu and Maoz signed a coalition agreement on 27 November, under which the latter would become a deputy minister, would head an agency on Jewish identity in the Prime Minister's Office, and would also head Nativ, which processes the aliyah from the former Soviet Union. The agency for Jewish identity would have authority over educational content taught outside the regular curriculum in schools, in addition to the department of the Ministry of Education overseeing external teaching and partnerships, which would bring nonofficial organisations permitted to teach and lecture at schools under its purview.

Likud signed a coalition agreement with the Religious Zionist Party on 1 December. Under the deal, Smotrich would serve as the Minister of Finance in rotation with Aryeh Deri, and the party will receive the post of a minister within the Ministry of Defense with control over the departments administering settlement and open lands under the Coordinator of Government Activities in the Territories, in addition to another post of a deputy minister. The deal also includes giving the post of Minister of Aliyah and Integration to Ofir Sofer, the newly created National Missions Ministry to Orit Strook, and the chairmanship of the Knesset's Constitution, Law and Justice Committee to Simcha Rothman.

Likud and United Torah Judaism signed a coalition agreement on 6 December, in order to allow request for an extension to the deadline. Under it, the party would receive the Ministry of Construction and Housing, the chairmanship of the Knesset Finance Committee which will be given to Moshe Gafni, the Ministry of Jerusalem and Tradition (which would replace the Ministry of Jerusalem Affairs and Heritage), in addition to several posts of deputy ministers and chairmanships of Knesset committees.

Likud also signed a deal with Shas by 8 December, securing interim coalition agreements with all of their allies. Under the deal, Deri will first serve as the Minister of Interior and Health, before rotating posts with Smotrich after two years. The party will also receive the Ministry of Religious Services and Welfare Ministries, as well as posts of deputy ministers in the Ministry of Education and Interior.

The vote to replace then-incumbent Knesset speaker Mickey Levy was scheduled for 13 December, after Likud and its allies secured the necessary number of signatures for it. Yariv Levin of Likud was elected as an interim speaker by 64 votes, while his opponents Merav Ben-Ari of Yesh Atid and Ayman Odeh of Hadash got 45 and five votes respectively.

Netanyahu asked Herzog for a 14-day extension after the agreement with Shas in order to finalise the roles his allied parties would play. Herzog on 9 December extended the deadline to 21 December. On that date, Netanyahu informed Herzog that he had succeeded in forming a coalition, with the new government expected to be sworn in by 2 January 2023. The government was sworn in on 29 December 2022.

Members of government

Ministers
The following are the current ministers in the government:

Deputy ministers

Principles and priorities 
According to the agreements signed between Likud and each of its coalition partners, and the incoming government's published guideline principles, its stated priorities are to combat the cost of living, further centralize Orthodox control over the state religious services, pass judicial reforms which include legislation to reduce judicial controls on executive and legislative power, expand settlements in the West Bank, and consider an annexation of the West Bank.

Before the vote of confidence in his new government in the Knesset, Netanyahu presented three top priorities for the new government: internal security and governance, halting the nuclear program of Iran, and the development of infrastructure, with a focus on further connecting the center of the country with its periphery.

Controversies

Judicial reforms 

The government's flagship program, centered around reforms in the judicial branch, drew widespread criticism. Critics highlighted the negative effects it would have on the separation of powers, the office of the Attorney General, the economy, public health, women and minorities, workers' rights, scientific research, the overall strength of Israel's democracy and its foreign relations.

Independence of the Israel Police 
In December 2022 Minister of National Security Itamar Ben-Gvir sought to amend the law that regulates the operations of the Israel Police, such that the ministry will have more direct control of its forces and policies, including its investigative priorities. Attorney General Gali Baharav-Miara objected to the draft proposal, raising concerns that the law would enable the politicization of police work, and the draft was amended to partially address those concerns. Nevertheless, in March 2023 Deputy Attorney General Gil Limon stated that the Attorney General's fears had been realized, referring to several instances of ministerial involvement in the day-to-day work of the otherwise independent police force - statements that were repeated by the Attorney General herself two days later. Separately, Police Commissioner Kobi Shabtai instructed Deputy Commissioners to avoid direct communication with the minister, later stating that "the Israel Police will remain apolitical, and act only according to law".

Following appeals by the Association for Civil Rights in Israel and the Movement for Quality Government in Israel, the High Court of Justice instructed Ben-Gvir "to refrain from giving operational directions to the police... [especially] as regards to protests and demonstrations against the regime."

The role of religion in public life 
The coalition's efforts to expand the purview of Rabbinical courts; force some organizations, such as hospitals, to enforce certain religious practices; amend the Law Prohibiting Discrimination to allow gender segregation and discrimination on the grounds of religious belief; expand funding for religious causes; and put into law the exemption of yeshiva and kolel students from conscription have drawn criticism.

Several banks and institutional investors, including the Israel Discount Bank and AIG have committed to avoid investing in, or providing credit to any organization that will discriminate against others on ground of religion, race, gender or sexual orientation.

A series of technology companies and investment firms including Wiz, Intel Israel, Salesforce and Microsoft Israel Research and Development, have criticized the proposed changes to the Law Prohibiting Discrimination, with Wiz stating that it will require its suppliers to commit to preventing discrimination.

Over sixty prominent law firms pledged that they will neither represent, nor do business with discriminating individuals and organizations.

Insight Partners, a major private equity fund operating in Israel, released a statement warning against intolerance and any attempt to harm personal liberties.

Orit Lahav, chief executive of the women's rights organization Mavoi Satum ("Dead End"), said that "the Rabbinical courts are the most discriminatory institution in the State of Israel... Limiting the HCJ while expanding the jurisdiction of the Rabbinical courts would... cause significant harm to women."

Anat Thon Ashkenazy, Director of the Center for Democratic Values and Institutions at the Israel Democracy Institute, said that "almost every part of the reform could harm women... the meaning of an override clause is that even if the court says that the law on gender segregation is illegitimate, is harmful, the Knesset could say 'Okay, we say otherwise'". She added that "there is a very broad institutional framework here, after which there will come legislation that harms women's right and we will have no way of protecting or stopping it."

According to the Haaretz op-ed of 7 March, "the current coalition is interested... in modifying the public space so it suits the religious lifestyle. The legal coup is meant to castrate anyone who can prevent it, most of all the HCJ."

The Law of Return 
The agreement signed by the coalition parties includes the setting up of a committee to draft changes to the Law of Return. Israeli religious parties have long demanded that the "grandchild clause" of the Law of Return be cancelled. This clause grants citizenship to anyone with at least one Jewish grandparent, as long as they do not practice another religion. If the grandchild clause were to be removed from the Law of Return then around 3 million people who are currently eligible for aliyah would no longer be eligible.

The heads of the Jewish Agency, the Jewish Federations of North America, the World Zionist Organization and Keren Hayesod sent a joint letter to Prime Minister Netanyahu, expressing their “deep concern” about any changes to the Law of Return, adding that "Any change in the delicate and sensitive status quo on issues such as the Law of Return or conversion could threaten to unravel the ties between us and keep us away from each other."

The Executive Council of Australian Jewry and the Zionist Federation of Australia issued a joint statement saying "We ... view with deep concern ... proposals in relation to religious pluralism and the law of return that risk damaging Israel's ... relationship with Diaspora Jewry."

Administration of governmental data, media and archives

Public broadcasting budget cuts 
Minister of Communication Shlomo Karhi had initially intended to cut the funding of the Israeli Public Broadcasting Corporation (also known as KAN) by 400 million shekels - roughly half of its total budget - closing several departments, and privatizing content creation.

In response, the head of the European Broadcasting Union, Noel Curran, sent an urgent letter to Netanyahu, expressing his concerns and his trust that "the new government will... safeguard the independence of KAN and enable it to continue to fulfill its mission in democratic society".

Later that month, nine journalist organizations representing some of IPB's  competitors issued a statement of concern, acknowledging the "important contribution of public broadcast in creating a worthy, unbiased and non-prejudicial journalistic platform", and noting that "the existence of the [broadcasting] corporation as a substantial public broadcast organization strengthens media as a whole, adding to the competition in the market rather than weakening it." They also expressed their concern that the "real reason" for the proposal was actually "an attempt to silence voices from which... [the Minister] doesn't always draw satisfaction". The same day, hundreds of journalists, actors and filmmakers protested in Tel Aviv.

The proposal was eventually put on hold.

Deputy National Statistician nominees 
On 22 February it was reported that Prime Minister Netanyahu was attempting to appoint his close associate Yossi Shelley as the deputy to the National Statistician — a highly sensitive position in charge of providing accurate data for decision makers. The appointment of Shelley, who did not posses the required qualifications for the role, was withdrawn following publication. In its daily editorial, Haaretz tied this attempt with the judicial reform: "once they take control of the judiciary, law enforcement and public media, they wish to control the state's data base, the dry numerical data it uses to plan its future". Netanyahu also proposed Avi Simhon for the role, and eventually froze all appointments at the Israel Central Bureau of Statistics.

Changes to the National Library of Israel's board of directors 
Also on 22 February, it was revealed that Yoav Kish, the Minister of Education, was promoting a draft government decision change to the National Library of Israel board of directors which would grant him more power over the institution. In response, the Hebrew University — which owned the library until 2008 — announced that if the draft is accepted, it will withdraw its collections from the library. The university's collections, which according to the university constitute some 80% of the library's collection, include the Agnon archive,  the original manuscript of Hatikvah, and the Rothschild Haggadah, the oldest known Haggadah.

A group of 300 authors and poets signed an open letter against the move, further noting their objection against "political takeover" of public broadcasting, as well as "any legislation that will castrate the judiciary and damage the democratic foundations of the state of Israel". Several days later, it was reported that a series of donors decided to withhold their donations to the library, totaling some 80 million shekels.

On 3 March a petition against the move by 1,500 academics, including Israel Prize laureates, was sent to Kish.

The proposal has been seen by some as retribution against Shai Nitzan, the former State Attorney and the library's current rector.

On 5 March it was reported that the Legal Advisor to the Ministry of Finance, Asi Messing, was withholding the proposal. According to Messing, the proposal - which was being promoted as part of the Economic Arrangements Law - "was not reviewed... by the qualified personnel in the Ministry of Finance, does not align with any of the common goals of the economic plan, was not agreed to by myself and was not approved by the Attorney General."

Environmental protection 
As of February 2023, the government has been debating several proposals that will significantly weaken the Ministry of Environmental Protection, including reducing the environmental regulation of planning and development and electricity production. One of the main proposals, the transferal of a 3 billion shekel fund meant to finance waste management plants from the Ministry of Environmental Protection to the Ministry of the Interior, was eventually withdrawn.

Donations to elected officials 
As of 5 March, the government was promoting an amendment to the Law on Public Service (Gifts) that would allow Netanyahu to receive donations to fund his legal defense. The amendment follows a decision by the High Court of Justice that forced Netanyahu to refund USD 270,000 given to him and his wife by his late cousin, Nathan Mileikowsky, for their legal defense. This is in contrast to past statements by Minister of Justice Yariv Levin, who spoke against the possible conflict of interests that can result from such transactions.

The proposal is opposed by the Attorney General Gali Baharav-Miara.

Personnel turnover 
During the first months of the administration, several media outlets noted unusual turnover among senior government employees, including senior career civil servants and non-political appointees. According to sources, Netanyahu is seeking out civil servants who were appointed by the previous government, with the intent of replacing them with people loyal to him.

Notes

References

External links 

 Thirty-seventh government of Israel. Knesset.

2022 establishments in Israel
2022 in Israeli politics
+37
Current governments
Cabinets established in 2022
 37